Love in a Puff may refer to:

 Love in a Puff (film), a 2010 Hong Kong film
 Cardiospermum halicacabum, a climbing plant also known as "love in a puff"